Thomas Henry Gee, Jr. (February 9, 1900 – August 15, 1984) was an American baseball catcher in the Negro leagues.

Biography
Gee was born in Cleburne, Texas. He played for the minor league Abilene Eagles of the West Texas League from 1920-1922. He then played for the Lincoln Giants in 1925. In 1926, he started the year with the Newark Stars, but returned to the Giants after Newark disbanded midseason.

He died on August 15, 1984 in Phoenix, Arizona.

Family life
Gee's brother, Rich Gee, also played in the Negro leagues, and was Tom's teammate with the Giants in 1925 and 1926.

Notes

External links
 and Seamheads

1900 births
1984 deaths
Lincoln Giants players
Newark Stars players
Baseball players from Texas
People from Cleburne, Texas
20th-century African-American sportspeople
Baseball catchers